Sana Gomes may refer to:

 Saná Gomes (footballer, born 1999), Bissau-Guinean football left-back for Noah
 Sana Gomes (footballer, born 2002), Bissau-Guinean football left-back for Portimonense